May is a 2002 American psychological horror film written and directed by Lucky McKee in his directorial debut. Starring Angela Bettis, Jeremy Sisto, Anna Faris, and James Duval, the film follows a lonely young woman (Bettis) traumatized by a difficult childhood, and her increasingly desperate attempts to connect with the people around her.

Although May was unsuccessful at the box office, it received favorable reviews from critics, and is now considered a cult film.

Plot

Veterinary assistant May Canady experienced a troubled childhood due to her lazy eye. Her only "true friend" is a glass-encased doll named Suzie, which her mother made and gifted May for her birthday with the adage "If you can't find a friend, make one." Her optometrist fixes May's lazy eye, first with glasses, then with contact lens.

May befriends local mechanic Adam and eventually begins dating him. She fixates on his hands, which she considers to be the most attractive part of him. May's lesbian colleague, Polly, also shows an interest in her. One day, May remarks that Polly has a beautiful neck. During their flirtation, Polly gives May a pet cat, Lupe.

May invites Adam to her apartment, where he shows her a film that he made for university, titled Jack and Jill. The film displays two young lovers who go on a picnic and end up eating each other. May becomes aroused by the cannibalism in the film. While passionately kissing, she bites Adam's lip, drawing blood. Disturbed, Adam abruptly leaves. May shouts at Suzie and shoves her in the cupboard.

May later begins volunteering at a school for blind children, where she takes a liking to a sullen young girl named Petey, who makes her a clay ashtray with the name "MAY" pressed into it. Abandoned by Adam, May gives in to Polly's advances and starts a short affair. May overhears Adam saying that he is glad he could get rid of her. Devastated, she visits Polly, but finds her with another girl named Ambrosia. When even Lupe refuses to come near her, an enraged May throws Petey's ashtray at her, killing her and shattering the ashtray. She develops delusions that Suzie is talking to her.

May takes Suzie to school, introducing her to the blind children as her best friend. The children struggle to take Suzie out of the glass case, ultimately shattering the case and injuring themselves and May. May returns home devastated with the ruined doll. The following day, she meets a young punk, who asks her if she wants to get some candy with him, which she accepts. May admires the tattoo on his arm. At her house, he discovers Lupe's corpse calls May a freak. May breaks down and fatally stabs him in the head. After heavily contemplating her future actions, May claims she needs "more parts".

On Halloween night, May dresses in a homemade costume resembling Suzie, adopts a normal personality, and goes to Polly's house, where she slits Polly's throat with a pair of surgical scalpels. When Ambrosia arrives, May stabs her in the temples. Next, she visits Adam and his new girlfriend at his house. May murders both of them with the scalpels. At home, she designs her "new friend", a life-sized patchwork doll made from the punk's arms, Polly's neck, Ambrosia's legs, Adam's hands, his girlfriend's ears, and Lupe's fur for the hair. Using the broken remnants of the "MAY" ashtray to form an anagram, she names the doll "Amy". She realizes that Amy has no eyes and cannot "see" her, so she gouges out her lazy eye. Crying in pain and bleeding, she puts the eye on Amy's head and begs the doll to look at her. She collapses on the bed beside the doll, and caresses it. Her creation comes to life, and brushes her face affectionately with Adam's hands.

Cast
 Angela Bettis as May Dove Canady 
 Chandler Riley Hecht as young May Dove Canady
 Jeremy Sisto as Adam Stubbs 
 Anna Faris as Polly 
 Nichole Hiltz as Ambrosia
 James Duval as the punk boy ("Blank")
 Ken Davitian as Foreign Doctor
 Kevin Gage as Papa Canady
 Merle Kennedy as Mama Canady
 Rachel David as Petey David
 Nora Zehetner as Adam Stubbs's new girlfriend ("Hoop")
 Will Estes as Chris, Adam Stubbs's roommate

Soundtrack

May also features a score and original songs by Jammes Luckett of the rock group Poperratic (then known as Alien Tempo Experiment 13).

Additional artists on the soundtrack include The Breeders, The Kelley Deal 6000, H Is Orange, Strangels, Thrill My Wife, The Wedding's Off, Angelo Metz, and Tommy James and the Shondells.

Some of Luckett's music from the film was released on the 2007 CD May and Other Selected Works of Jaye Barnes Luckett by La-La Land Records.

Release
May was given a limited theatrical release to nine theaters in North America. By the end of its run, the film had grossed $150,277 during its theatrical run. It eventually grossed $634,803 worldwide on its $1.7 million budget.

Critical reception
The film received favorable reviews from critics. Review aggregator website Rotten Tomatoes reports that 70% of 69 critics have given the film a positive review, with a rating average of 6.1/10. The site's critical consensus states that it is an "above average slasher flick." On Metacritic, which assigns a weighted average score out of 100 to reviews from mainstream critics, the film received an average score of 58 based on 18 reviews.

Critics praised the film for its unique feel while also complimenting its brutality through the eyes of someone who is so caught up in their own fantasy of sorts. Bettis' performance was also praised. Roger Ebert granted the film four stars out of four, and called it "a horror film and something more and deeper, something disturbing and oddly moving" and characterized the denouement as "a final shot that would get laughs in another kind of film, but May earns the right to it, and it works, and we understand it". Variety magazine critic David Rooney turned in a review that was more middle of the road, stating that the film was "More successful when the title character finally embarks on her bloody mission than in the dawdling buildup". The New York Times critic Stephen Holden opined that "the performances are a cut or two above what you would find in the average slasher film. But in the end that's all it is".

In 2006, the Chicago Film Critics Association named May the 61st-scariest film ever made.

Bloody Disgusting ranked the film #17 in their list of the "Top 20 Horror Films of the Decade", with the article calling the film "criminally under-seen at the time of its release... The plotting itself manages to sidestep the usual slasher tropes as it slowly and inexorably unravels, all leading up to a quietly haunting conclusion that is as heart-wrenching as it is unnerving." Albert Nowicki included the film on his list of "best Halloween movies of all time" for Prime Movies.

Awards
 Brussels International Festival of Fantasy Film:
 Best Actress: Angela Bettis
 Sitges - Catalan International Film Festival:
 Best Actress: Angela Bettis
 Best Screenplay: Lucky McKee
 Gérardmer Film Festival:
 Premiere Award: Lucky McKee
 Málaga International Week of Fantastic Cinema:
 Best Actress: Angela Bettis
 Best Film: Lucky McKee
 Best Screenplay: Lucky McKee
 Youth Jury Award- Best Feature Film: Lucky McKee

Inspiration
Lucky McKee has stated that "May wouldn't exist if it weren't for Amanda Plummer's character in The Fisher King."

See also
 List of films featuring Frankenstein's monster

References

External links
 
 
 
 

2002 films
2002 independent films
2002 LGBT-related films
2000s psychological drama films
2000s psychological horror films
2000s serial killer films
American independent films
American LGBT-related films
American psychological horror films
American slasher films
American splatter films
Bisexuality-related films
2000s English-language films
Films about dysfunctional families
Films about imaginary friends
Films directed by Lucky McKee
Films shot in Los Angeles
American horror drama films
Lesbian-related films
LGBT-related horror drama films
Lionsgate films
2002 directorial debut films
2002 drama films
2000s American films